Andrew Mark Oakes (born 11 January 1977) is an English former football goalkeeper. His uncle is the Manchester City midfielder Alan Oakes. His cousin Michael Oakes, also a goalkeeper, played for Aston Villa, Wolverhampton Wanderers and Cardiff City.

He spent his early years at Macclesfield Town and Winsford United, before playing for Hull City in 1998–99. He then was signed by Premier League side Derby County for £465,000. He spent his six years at Pride Park as a back-up keeper, and also spent brief spells on loan at Port Vale and Bolton Wanderers. He signed with Walsall in March 2005, before moving on to Swansea City in August 2006. He signed with Darlington in May 2007, before leaving the game two years later.

Career
Oakes started his career with Barnton, but joined Macclesfield Town in the 1996–97 season as cover for regular goalkeeper Ryan Price as the club battled towards promotion into the Football League. Oakes played once for the "Silkmen", in a 2–0 FA Cup defeat to Rochdale, where he reportedly played with a broken finger. After the season finished he moved on to Northern Premier League side Winsford United. In December 1998 he returned to the Football League when he signed with Third Division club Hull City, who were then managed by Warren Joyce. He played twenty games of the 1998–99 season, and his performances at Boothferry Park earned him a £465,000 move to Premier League side Derby County in June 1999. He immediately went out on loan with Port Vale, but returned to Pride Park within three weeks having failed to make an appearance for Brian Horton's "Valiants".

He was the understudy to Mart Poom, before becoming the first choice keeper in 2001–02, playing 22 games. He had lost his first team place when manager Jim Smith resigned in October 2001, but won back his place when Colin Todd was sacked and replaced by John Gregory in January. The "Rams" were relegated at the end of the season, finishing ten points behind 17th place Sunderland. Teenager Lee Grant was favoured more in 2002–03, and Oakes was restricted to seven First Division appearances. He played ten games in 2003–04, as Grant continued to be favoured by new boss George Burley. Grant was dropped in 2004–05, only for 20-year-old Lee Camp to claim the first team jersey. Oakes joined Bolton Wanderers on loan at the start of the 2004–05 season as back-up to Jussi Jääskeläinen, but only made the one appearance.

He moved on to Paul Merson's Walsall on a free transfer in March 2005, and featured in the last nine games of the campaign. He played 30 games in 2005–06, having missed September to December. With the "Saddlers" suffering relegation, he was released from the Bescot Stadium in May 2006. He signed with Kenny Jackett's Swansea City in August 2006. Playing six games of the 2006–07 season, with only one appearances coming at the Liberty Stadium, he was not offered a new contract in the summer by new boss Roberto Martínez. Oakes signed with Darlington in May 2007. He made 18 appearances for Dave Penney's "Quakers", before retiring from the game in 2009.

Career statistics

References

1977 births
Living people
Sportspeople from Northwich
English footballers
Association football goalkeepers
Barnton F.C. players
Macclesfield Town F.C. players
Winsford United F.C. players
Hull City A.F.C. players
Derby County F.C. players
Port Vale F.C. players
Bolton Wanderers F.C. players
Walsall F.C. players
Swansea City A.F.C. players
Darlington F.C. players
Northern Premier League players
English Football League players
Premier League players